Uta Pippig (born 7 September 1965) is a retired German long-distance runner, and the first woman to officially win the Boston Marathon three consecutive times (1994–1996). She also won the Berlin Marathon three times (1990, 1992 and 1995); the 1993 New York City Marathon; represented Germany at the Olympic Games in 1992 and 1996, and won a bronze medal at the 1991 World 15km Road Race Championship. Her marathon best of 2:21:45 set in Boston in 1994, made her the third-fastest female marathon runner in history at that time.

Career   
The daughter of two physicians, Pippig was born in Leipzig and began running at the age of 13 while a citizen of the former East Germany. She finished 14th in the marathon at the 1987 World Championships. In university, she was a medical student at the Humboldt University Berlin where, after passing her final exams, she chose to re-focus her attention exclusively on running professionally. She left East Germany in 1990 before German reunification. She won the Eurocross meeting in Luxembourg that year.

Pippig's results on the track at 10,000 meters, include finishing sixth at the 1991 World Championships, seventh at the 1992 Olympic Games, and ninth at the 1993 World Championships. She also won a bronze medal at the 1991 World 15 km Road Race Championship.

Pippig won the 1994 Boston Marathon in a lifetime best of 2:21:45, which at the time put her third on the world all-time list behind Ingrid Kristiansen and Joan Benoit. , the time still ranks her second on the German all-time list behind Irina Mikitenko. Pippig won the 1996 Boston Marathon in the midst of ischemic colitis. This was incorrectly attributed to menstruation.. Eileen McNamara's. At the 1996 Olympic Games, she dropped out of the marathon after 22 miles, having led earlier in the race.

In 1998, an out-of-competition drug test found Pippig had an elevated ratio of testosterone to epitestosterone, and the German Athletics Federation attempted to ban her for two years. Pippig contested the finding on the grounds that her testosterone levels were normal, and that the elevated ratio was due to a low level of epitestosterone from a long battle with chronic bowel disease and other factors. This claim was supported by a variety of independent medical experts, and a German arbitration court dismissed the case.

In 2004, Pippig founded Take the Magic Step to provide health information and charitable support to individuals and to organizations that promote wellness and education. In 2005, she was named to the board of advisors of the MIT Agelab. In 2008, Pippig and Take The Magic Step business consultant Michael Reger created the Take The Magic Step Foundation to provide financial and logistical support to organizations that promote education, fitness, and health. The foundation's mission is to improve the lives of underprivileged children through organizations already established to help others. The foundation supports organizations such as SOS Outreach in Colorado, the Louisa May Alcott Orchard House in Massachusetts, and the Kinderhilfe e.V. charity in Pippig's hometown of Petertargen, Germany.

In 2012 Pippig began her international speaking series, Running To Freedom. The series explores the value of freedom to individuals and society, and includes Pippig's own history of her journey to freedom. In 2016 Pippig began writing a column for the German newspaper Die Welt, and then for the German running magazine Laufzeit & Condition. In 2017, Pippig became the running expert and spokesperson for the Berlin Marathon.

Achievements

Personal bests
5000 metres - 15:04.87 (1991)
10,000 metres - 31:21.36 (1992)
Half-marathon - 67:58 (1995)
Marathon - 2:21:45 (1994)

Notes

References

External links
 Official Website of Uta Pippig
 Boston Globe Article on Uta
 IAAF Biography on Uta Pippig
 
    
 

1965 births
Living people
East German female long-distance runners
East German female marathon runners
German female marathon runners
German female long-distance runners
Athletes (track and field) at the 1992 Summer Olympics
Athletes (track and field) at the 1996 Summer Olympics
Olympic athletes of Germany
Athletes from Leipzig
Boston Marathon female winners
New York City Marathon female winners
World Athletics Championships athletes for East Germany
World Athletics Championships athletes for Germany
Recipients of the Association of International Marathons and Distance Races Best Marathon Runner Award